Catherine Louise Bond-Mills (born 20 September 1967 in Woodstock, Ontario) is a Canadian retired track and field athlete who specialised in the heptathlon. She represented her country at two Summer Olympics, in 1992 and 1996, as well as three World Championships.

Competition record

Personal bests
Outdoor
200 metres – 24.79 (-0.2 m/s) (Stuttgart 1993)
800 metres – 2:12.57 (Seville 1999)
100 metres hurdles – 13.92 (-0.2 m/s) (Gothenburg 1995)
High jump – 1.80 (Gothenburg 1995)
Long jump – 5.61 (-0.4 m/s) (Seville 1999)
Shot put – 13.56 (Seville 1999)
Javelin throw – 37.28 (Seville 1999)
Heptathlon – 6193 (Victoria 1994)
Indoor
Pentathlon – 4309 (Edmonton 1999)

References

1967 births
Living people
Canadian heptathletes
Athletes (track and field) at the 1992 Summer Olympics
Athletes (track and field) at the 1996 Summer Olympics
Athletes (track and field) at the 1990 Commonwealth Games
Athletes (track and field) at the 1994 Commonwealth Games
Athletes (track and field) at the 1998 Commonwealth Games
Athletes (track and field) at the 1991 Pan American Games
Athletes (track and field) at the 1999 Pan American Games
Olympic track and field athletes of Canada
People from Woodstock, Ontario
Commonwealth Games medallists in athletics
Commonwealth Games bronze medallists for Canada
Pan American Games track and field athletes for Canada
Medallists at the 1994 Commonwealth Games